This is a discography of Kottonmouth Kings, an American hip hop group from Orange County, California

Albums

Studio albums

Compilation, remix, and live albums

EP releases

Singles

Nugg of the Week
On April 20, 2011, the Kottonmouth Kings began featuring a "Nugg of the Week" on their website: a song (and on one occasion, an EP) available for free download.  The Nugg of the Week is usually posted on Tuesday, Wednesday, or Thursday and is available for approximately a week before being replaced by another song.  These songs consist of a-sides, b-sides, remixes, solo tracks by Kottonmouth Kings members, and collaborations with other artists.  The following list only includes material that was previously unreleased when it was first made available as a Nugg of the Week.

Appearances on albums by multiple artists

Guest appearances

Videography

References

Hip hop discographies
Punk rock group discographies
Rap rock discographies
Discographies of American artists